Constantine W. Buckley (January 22, 1815 – December 19, 1865) was an American politician in Texas who served two non-consecutive terms as Speaker of the Texas House of Representatives between 1861 and 1863.

Buckley was born January 22, 1815, in Surry County, North Carolina, but had moved to Georgia by 1828 where he began working as a store clerk. In 1834 in Columbus, Buckley opened a store of his own, which closed after the Panic of 1837. After losing everything, he moved to Houston in the Republic of Texas, where he was a clerk in the State Department. While Buckley worked there, he was tutored in law by Attorney General John Birdsall, which enabled Buckley's admission to the bar in November 1839.

Gov. James Pinckney Henderson appointed him a District Judge in 1847, but Buckley resigned in 1854 in order to resume private practice. Buckley was first elected to the Texas House of Representatives from Richmond in 1857. He represented Austin and Fort Bend counties in the Seventh, Eighth, and Ninth Legislatures. On November 4, 1861, at the beginning of the Regular Session of the Ninth Legislature, Buckley was elected Speaker and served until he apparently resigned on December 7, 1861. After Buckley's successor, Nicholas Henry Darnell resigned sometime in 1862, Buckley was elected to the vacant office  of Speaker for the First Called Session that convened on February 2, 1863, defeating Reps. Robert Turner Flewellen and John Smith, 54 votes to 5 and 1, respectively.

Buckley was married twice, the first time in 1840. He had three children with his first wife who had apparently died by 1852 when Buckley then married Mrs. Ann R. Nibbs. Buckley drowned in the Brazos River near Columbia, Texas, on December 19, 1865.

Notes

References

 

1815 births
1865 deaths
Speakers of the Texas House of Representatives
Members of the Texas House of Representatives
Texas lawyers
Texas state court judges
Deaths by drowning in the United States
Accidental deaths in Texas
People from Surry County, North Carolina
19th-century American politicians
19th-century American judges
19th-century American lawyers